Public intoxication, also known as "drunk and disorderly" and "drunk in public", is a summary offense in some countries rated to public cases or displays of drunkenness. Public intoxication laws vary widely by jurisdiction, but usually require an obvious display of intoxicated incompetence or behavior which disrupts public order before the charge is levied.

Australia 

The Royal Commission into Aboriginal Deaths in Custody (1987–1991) found public drunkenness disproportionately affected Aboriginal people. Public drunkenness was decriminalised in New South Wales in 1979, the Northern Territory and in South Australia in 1984. In New South Wales, police have the discretion to issue "on the spot" fines or infringement notices for "drunk in public", a fine that can cost the individual over $480 (4 penalty units). Community Legal Centres across the state complain about these fines and the impact it has had on various vulnerable members of the community, including young people, the homeless and minority groups. For example, a "drunk and disorderly" fine in New South Wales starts at $550. As of February 2009, local councils in New South Wales are not allowed to charge people who drink in alcohol-free zones; they are only permitted to confiscate the alcohol of the intoxicated person.

By legislative changes in February 2021, Victoria will finally decriminalise public drunkenness from November 2022, after which drunkenness will be treated as a public health issue, not a criminal one. In Victoria, there are currently two drinking offences: "drunk in a public place" and "drunk and disorderly in a public place". These are separate offences contained in the Summary Offences Act 1966 which have their own power of arrest. Changes in 2006 allow police to issue an infringement notice for these offences, in addition to the traditional method of charging and bailing the offender to the Magistrates' Court. The current fine attached to the infringement notice is $590 for a first offence and $1,100 for a subsequent offence. A person arrested for being drunk or drunk and disorderly is held at the Melbourne Custody Centre or the cells at a police station or placed in the care of a friend or relative. 

Queensland will be the only state in Australia that will have a specific offence of public drunkenness.

Canada

In Canada, liquor is regulated by the provinces rather than the federal government.

In British Columbia and Ontario, drinking in public and public intoxication are offenses. If an event is to take place in public with alcohol it must have a permit. In Ontario, having an open container in public garners a $125 fine and public drunkenness garners a $65 fine and detainment until sober. While liquor laws are similar in provinces, the laws in territories tend to be substantially different. For instance, in the Northwest Territories public intoxication can result in imprisonment or detention in a medical facility for up to 24 hours (NWT Liquor Act).

New Zealand
In New Zealand, drinking in public is not a crime and instead, local governments must specify that alcohol is banned in an area before it is considered a crime to drink in that location. Being drunk in public is not specifically an offense unless the person who is intoxicated is a public nuisance, in which case they may be dealt with for 'disturbing the peace'. This will usually result in being taken home, or otherwise taken to a police cell until sober.

United Kingdom 

In the United Kingdom, there are a number of offences dealing with intoxication, which vary between the constituent countries.

In a public place, it is an offence to be:
drunk
drunk and disorderly

It is also an offence to be drunk:
while boarding, or while on board, an aircraft
while in charge of a child under 7 years old
while travelling to a "designated sporting event" (usually professional football matches) on public transport or a vehicle with eight seats or more
while in, or attempting to enter, a "designated sporting ground" (a football ground) during a designated sporting event.

The police will only get involved if the person is so drunk they are unable to act in a reasonable manner, such as passing out on the street. In that case, typically the police will, depending on the circumstances, help the intoxicated person on their way or place the person in a police station cell until sober. Once fit to be dealt with the detained person will normally either be cautioned, be issued with a penalty notice for disorder (PND – £90 fine in ticket form), or bailed to appear at the local court. The court in turn may issue a fine (up to level 1 or level 3 on the standard scale depending on the offence charged).

There are also many more specific offences, including driving a motor vehicle while unfit through drink (or being found 'drunk in charge'), driving a motor vehicle while over the prescribed limit, and riding a cycle while unfit through drink. Furthermore, the police have the power (although not the obligation) to confiscate any alcohol which is being consumed in public by those under 18, and local authorities have the power to prohibit alcohol consumption in certain areas.

United States

1968 Constitutional challenge
In 1968, in the case of Powell v. Texas, the Texas law against public intoxication was challenged in the Supreme Court of the United States for alleged violation of Eighth Amendment, which forbids cruel and unusual punishment. The court upheld the law, ruling that criminalizing public intoxication was neither cruel nor unusual.

State public intoxication laws today

California: California Penal Code 647(f) considers public intoxication a misdemeanor. The code describes public intoxication as someone who displays intoxication to liquor, drugs, controlled substances, or toluene and demonstrates an inability to care for themselves or others, or interferes or obstructs the free use of streets, sidewalks or other public way. California Penal Code 647(g) affords law enforcement the option to take an individual fitting the arrest criteria for 647(f), and no other crime, into civil protective custody if a "sobering facility" is available. Often, this manifests in the form of a so-called drunk tank.  Essentially, the detainee agrees to remain at the location until the facility's staff consents to their departure; usually after four hours and upon the belief that the detainee is safe to look after themselves.   Not every municipality in California has such a facility.  Also, if a person is being combative and/or is under the influence of drugs, they will be taken to jail.  Unlike a person who is taken to jail, a civil detainee under 647(g) is not later prosecuted in a court of law.
Colorado: Public intoxication in the state of Colorado is not punished with criminal or civil penalties. Instead, state law prohibits the passing of local laws that penalize public intoxication, but state law provides for the creation of patrols trained to provide assistance to intoxicated and incapacitated people.
Georgia: In Georgia, public intoxication is a class B misdemeanor. Public intoxication is defined as a person who shall be and appear in an intoxicated condition in any public place or within the curtilage of any private residence not his own other than by invitation of the owner or lawful occupant, which condition is made manifest by boisterousness, by indecent condition or act, or by vulgar, profane, loud, or unbecoming language.
Indiana: In Indiana, public intoxication is a class B misdemeanor, punishable with up to 180 days in jail, and a $1,000 fine. As of 2012, simply being intoxicated in public is no longer a crime. The person must also be, (1) endangering the person's life; (2) endangering the life of another person;(3) breaching the peace or is in imminent danger of breaching the peace; or (4) is harassing, annoying, or alarming another person. (See IC 7.1-5-1-3).
Iowa: The Code of Iowa Sec 123.46 states that "a person shall not be intoxicated or simulate intoxication in a public place". Public Intoxication is a Simple Misdemeanor punishable by a maximum of 30 days' jail and a $1,000 fine. Aggravated Public Intoxication (3rd or subsequent Offense) is an Aggravated Misdemeanor punishable by a maximum of 2 years in prison. As of 2013, Johnson County, home of the University of Iowa had the highest arrest rate for public intoxication of any county in the state, at 8.28 per 1,000 residents.
Kansas: Being drunk in public in Kansas is not a criminal offense. Kansas statute 65-4059 states "No county or city shall adopt any local law, ordinance, resolution or regulation having the force of law rendering public intoxication by alcohol in and of itself or being a common drunkard or being found in enumerated places in an intoxicated condition, an offense, a violation, or the subject of criminal penalties."
Minnesota: Public intoxication is not a crime in Minnesota. However, cities can enact laws against public intoxication, such as the City of St. Cloud.
Missouri has no state public intoxication law. Missouri's permissive alcohol laws both protect people from suffering any criminal penalty (including arrest) for the mere act of being drunk in public, and prohibit local jurisdictions from enacting criminal public intoxication laws on their own.
Montana state law states that public intoxication is not a crime. However, the law allows law enforcement to take an intoxicated person home, or to detain them, if they are a danger to themselves or others. The law also states that no record can be made that indicates the person was arrested or detained for being intoxicated.
Nevada has no state public intoxication law. Nevada state law both protects people from suffering any criminal penalty (including arrest) for the mere act of being drunk in public, and prohibits local jurisdictions from enacting criminal public intoxication laws on their own.
Oregon: The state has no laws against public intoxication and actively bans local intoxication ordinances in §430.402. "However, if the person is incapacitated, the health of the person appears to be in immediate danger, or the police have reasonable cause to believe the person is dangerous to self or to any other person, the person shall be taken by the police to an appropriate treatment facility." § 430.399 
Texas: Public intoxication is a Class C misdemeanor (Class C misdemeanors are punishable by fine only not to exceed $500). However, if the offender is a minor, harsher penalties apply (especially if a two-time prior offender in which case jail time can be ordered). Section 49.01 of the Penal Code, which legally defines "intoxication", includes both a blood alcohol content greater than 0.08 but also defines it as "not having the normal use of mental or physical faculties by reason of the introduction of alcohol, a controlled substance, a drug, a dangerous drug, a combination of two or more of those substances, or any other substance into the body"; thus, a breathalyzer or field sobriety test is not required to prove public intoxication.  This low standard of proof has led to criticism that officers are using "public intoxication" as a means of harassment, especially towards minority groups.
Virginia criminalizes public intoxication under section 18.2-388 of the Code of Virginia. It is punishable by a fine of up to $250. 
Wisconsin also does not have a state public intoxication law although municipalities may pass city ordinances prohibiting public intoxication. Public intoxication is legal in Milwaukee; however, public drinking is not.
To sum up, misconducting in public while drunk could be fined in California, Georgia, Indiana, Iowa, Texas and Virginia.

See also 
 Alcohol law
 Drinking in public
 Drunk walking
 Public-order crime
 definition of driving while intoxicated (DWI)

References 

Alcohol-related crimes
State law in the United States
Law of the United Kingdom
Intoxication